Henry Bentinck may refer to:

Henry Bentinck, 1st Duke of Portland (1682–1726), British MP for Southampton and Governor of Jamaica
Henry Bentinck (British Army officer) (1796–1878), British general and courtier
Lord Henry Bentinck (1804–1870), British MP for Nottinghamshire North
Henry Bentinck, 11th Earl of Portland (1919–1997), British intellectual, peer and TV-producer

See also
Lord Henry Cavendish-Bentinck (1863–1931), British MP for Norfolk North-West and Nottingham South, Lord Lieutenant of Westmorland